Ubi MRT station is an underground Mass Rapid Transit (MRT) station on the Downtown Line (DTL). Located in Geylang planning area, Singapore, the station is near the junction of Ubi Avenue 1 and Ubi Avenue 2. The station serves mainly industrial workers, and residents, in and around the Kampong Ubi estate. The word Ubi refers to ”tapioca” in Malay.

It also provides easier access to two schools, Maha Bodhi School and Manjusri Secondary School. By 2022, the station will also serve the upcoming Ubi Grove neighbourhood.

History
The station was first announced on 20 August 2010 when the 16 stations of the  Downtown Line Stage 3 (DTL3) from the River Valley (now Fort Canning) to Expo stations were unveiled. The line was expected to be completed in 2017. Construction of the station and the tunnels was scheduled to commence in the second quarter of this year and was targeted to be completed in 2017.

The station opened on 21 October 2017, as announced by the Land Transport Authority on 31 May 2017.

References

External links

Railway stations in Singapore opened in 2017
Geylang
Mass Rapid Transit (Singapore) stations